The following is a list of notable alumni of collegiate a cappella singing groups.

See also 

List of collegiate a cappella groups
Collegiate a cappella
A cappella

References

A cappella musical groups
Lists of musicians by genre